Garin Brandon Justice (born March 10, 1982) is an American college football coach and former player. He was the offensive coordinator and offensive line coach for the UNLV Rebels and former head coach of the Concord Mountain Lions. He is currently serving as the offensive line coach with the Miami Hurricanes.

Head coaching record

References

External links
 Arizona profile
 Concord profile
 Florida Atlantic profile
 UNLV profile
 West Virginia profile

1982 births
Living people
American football offensive tackles
Arizona Wildcats football coaches
Concord Mountain Lions football coaches
Florida Atlantic Owls football coaches
Florida State Seminoles football coaches
Florida State University alumni
People from Gilbert, West Virginia
UNLV Rebels football coaches
West Virginia Mountaineers football coaches
West Virginia Mountaineers football players